Theodor Elsenhans (1862-1918) was a German psychologist and neo-Kantian philosopher.

Life
Elsenhans started studying theology at the University of Tübingen, but became interested in philosophy. He received his doctorate in 1885. In 1902 he completed his Habilitationsschrift at Heidelberg University, with a monograph on Kant and the post-Kantian Jakob Friedrich Fries. In 1908 he took up a professorship at Dresden University, where he continued to work on epistemology.

Works
 Psychologie und Logik zur Einführung in die Philosophie: für Oberklassen höherer Schulen und zum Selbststudium[Psychology and logic as an introduction to philosophy: for upper secondary school classes and for self-study], 1890
 Wesen und Entstehung des Gewissens: Eine Psychologie der Ethik [The nature and origin of conscience: a psyschology of ethics], 1894.
 Das Kant-Friesische Problem [The Kant-Fries problem], 1902.
 Lehrbuch der psychologie [Handbook of psychology], 1912

References

1862 births
1918 deaths
German psychologists
German philosophers